The Peiwar Kotal Pass, also spelled Paywar, is a mountain pass in the Kurram Valley that connects Paktia Province in Afghanistan to Kurram District in the Khyber Pakhtunkhwa province of Pakistan.

In November 1878, during the Second Anglo-Afghan War, Peiwar Kotal was the site of a battle between British-led forces under Sir Frederick Roberts and Afghan forces. Roberts outmaneuvered the Afghans and secured a British victory and control of the pass.

See also 
 Battles of the Second Anglo-Afghan War
 Battle of Peiwar Kotal
 Kurram Valley
 Loya Paktia
 Parachinar

References

Mountain passes of Pakistan
Mountain passes of Afghanistan
Mountain passes of the Hindu Kush
Landforms of Paktia Province